Original gangster or original gangsta may refer to:

 Original Gangstas, a 1996 action film
 Original Gangstas (soundtrack), the 1996 soundtrack to the film
 Original Gangsters (gang), a criminal gang in Sweden
 O.G. Original Gangster, a 1991 album by Ice-T
 "O.G. Original Gangster" (song), a song on the album
 Original Gangster, a 2020 film starring Steve Guttenberg

See also 
 OG (disambiguation)